Al Areen Wildlife Park (transliterated: Maḥmīyat al-ʿArīn) is a nature reserve and zoo, located in Sakhir, Bahrain. It is one of five other protected areas in the country and it is the only designated protected area on land, in the country.

History and profile
The park covers a total area of 7 km sq and was first established in 1976.  Species native to Bahrain, both plants and animals, as well as species originating from Africa, south Asia are present in the zoological park. In 2013, the park attracted 199,235 visitors to the park.

As of 1999, the park was attached to the ministry of cabinet affairs and information.

Attractions
The park features 100,000 planted flora and trees, & more than 45 species of animals, 82 species of birds and 25 species of flora.  Species that roam the nature reserve section of the park include the Arabian oryx, which is extinct in the wild, South African cheetah,  lion, Savannah monitor, African rock python, Persian gazelle, springbok, African wild dog, Spotted hyena, saluki dogs, impala, fallow deer, Chapman's zebra, Honey badger and desert hares.  Arabian and North African species such as the scimitar-horned oryx, addax (which is rare in the wild), dama gazelle, giraffes, Nubian ibex, wild goat, barbary sheep and Asiatic onager are also present.  The park also employs a captive breeding policy of endangered species.

The Al Areen area covers a total area of 800 hectares, divided into two 400-hectares sections; one section dedicated to the public while the other section is a protected reserve, equipped with two surface reservoirs for flora and fauna. The park has undergone multiple renovations in the previous decade, adding an aviary and an Arabian wild animals complex. A falcon stadium and petting zoo was opened in 2014 under the sponsorship of Viva Bahrain.

Access
The reserve is restricted, except for specialists, researchers, veterinarians and the animals’ keepers. Entrance to the reserve area of the park is prohibited unless prior permission is obtained. Public access to the park's animals is provided by tour-buses from the main entrance.
The park itself is a 40-minute drive from Manama, connected by a highway, and is located adjacent to Bahrain International Circuit.

References 

1976 establishments in Bahrain
Protected areas established in 1976
Wildlife sanctuaries of Bahrain